The Moruya Mechanics' Institute is a heritage-listed mechanics' institute located at 13 Page Street, Moruya in the Eurobodalla Shire local government are of New South Wales, Australia. It was added to the New South Wales State Heritage Register on 2 April 1999.

Heritage listing 
The Moruya Mechanics' Institute was listed on the New South Wales State Heritage Register on 2 April 1999.

See also 

List of Schools of Arts in New South Wales

References

Attribution 

New South Wales State Heritage Register
Eurobodalla Shire
Schools of Arts in New South Wales
Articles incorporating text from the New South Wales State Heritage Register